The following are reportedly haunted locations in Pennsylvania:

Gettysburg
Gettysburg, the location of one of the most historic battles in the Civil War, is reputed to be one of the most haunted locations in Pennsylvania.  Many paranormal teams have traveled to Gettysburg from across the world in attempt to contact the dead, like Union and Confederate soldiers. 
 The Devil's Den is reputed to be haunted by soldiers of the Battle of Gettysburg, Second Day. One infamous soldier in particular has long grey hair, dirty, torn buckskin clothing, a large floppy hat, and no shoes.

 The Farnsworth House Inn is reported to be haunted by the ghosts of women, children, cats, a nurse named Mary, and Confederate soldiers, most notably a soldier named Walter who is known to harm women.
 Gettysburg College has reportedly been the site of much paranormal activity. One story is of two administrators who took the elevator in Pennsylvania Hall. It went past their floor to the basement. When it stopped and the elevator door opened, the pair saw a live hospital scene devoid of sound. They desperately pressed the button to close the door, and claim one of the orderlies looked up at them just before it closed.
 The Jennie Wade House is reputed to be haunted by orphaned children.

 Several stories persist of paranormal activity at Little Round Top. One such story involves American Civil War re-enactors who worked as extras on the film Gettysburg. They claim to have been visited by a man in a Union soldier uniform who they assumed worked on the movie. He passed them ammunition and left. The men assumed the ammunition was blank rounds but later realized it was musket rounds. Later, they learned the ammunition dated back to the Civil War and was in pristine condition.

 Near the Sachs Covered Bridge, there have been sightings of a ghostly battle within a sudden fog.
 The Slaughter Pen is said to be haunted by a little girl in a white dress.
 The Soldiers National Museum is allegedly haunted by Rosa Carmichael, who operated the American Civil War-era orphanage that used to be on the site.
 The Tillie Pierce House allegedly has a shadow play and a mysterious boom that reverberates through the house every night at 3:02 a.m.
 It has been reported that at Triangular Field cameras will fail to operate without reason, and the sounds of battle are recorded while such activity is not present.
 The Codori Farm was “ground zero” for Pickett's Charge where wounded and dying Union and Confederate soldiers set up an uneasy truce in the farm house cellar waiting out the battle. Afterward 500 Confederate soldiers were buried on the farm. Footsteps have often been heard in the home and ghostly apparitions been seen in and around the barn.

Philadelphia

 The Abington Club in Abington, PA, reportedly has many ghostly figures that have allegedly been seen walking the pool deck at night, as well as other strange occurrences such as locked doors swinging open and lights turning on and off.  
On foggy nights on Allens Lane, there have been sightings of a decapitated American Revolutionary War soldier riding horseback and carrying his severed head.
 Baleroy Mansion in Chestnut Hill is said to be haunted by at least seven ghosts that appear as full body apparitions and as poltergeist activity, sometimes as ectoplasm. One chair is said to be cursed and those that sit in it die shortly afterward. The ghost of Thomas Jefferson reportedly haunts the dining room, standing beside a tall clock.
 It is suggested that the Betsy Ross House is haunted by the spirit of its namesake.
 Visitors to the Bishop White House claim to see the ghosts of an elderly housekeeper on the first floor, a meowing cat, and a tall, thin man on the third floor.
 At the grave of Benjamin Franklin at Christ Church, visitors leave cents because of the founding father's quote, "A penny saved is twopence dear." However, visitors have also reported being struck by cents near the grave by an unseen force.
 City Tavern is said to be haunted by a waiter and a young bride.
 Cliveden Manor is believed to be haunted by Continental soldiers that died in the Battle of Germantown and an elderly woman searching for her head, which was severed by a crazed Continental soldier.

 Eastern State Penitentiary is reported to have apparitions, perhaps hundreds, walk its corridors. Infamous resident Al Capone was said to be haunted by the ghost of James Clark, slain under orders of Capone in the Saint Valentine's Day massacre. The guard tower is reputed to be haunted by the ghost of a guard. Cell Block 12 is credited as the site's most haunted location featuring shadow mass figures.
 The First Bank of the United States is reportedly haunted by the ghost of Alexander Hamilton.
 Fort Mifflin is said to be haunted by the ghosts of Colonial soldiers, most notably a soldier named Amos that has reportedly been seen multiple times cleaning his gun by the artillery shed, a lamplighter has been seen striding about the soldiers' barracks, and there have been sightings of ghosts in the Casemates, one allegedly faceless. Sounds have been heard, like the sound of Jacob Sauer's Blacksmith shop and a screaming lady in the officers' quarters.
 Grumblethorpe is believed to be haunted by James Agnew and an orphan of the Yellow Fever Epidemic of 1793 named Justinia. Her sightings are usually accompanied by the smell of baking bread, her passion in life.
 The Hag of Pine Street is said to be an elderly woman that died in her home on Pine Street. She is said to haunt the area, either glaring out of her home's window or yelling and swiping her cane at young people in the streets of Society Hill.
 Claims persist of ghosts and paranormal mists that explore Independence Hall. People have claimed to see the spirits of Benedict Arnold and Benjamin Franklin.
Leverington Cemetery in Roxborough was listed by WHYY-TV on the top 6 haunted and eerie spots in Northwest Philadelphia and is known as "one of most actively documented locations for orbs and apparitions in Philadelphia".
 Library Hall features a statue of Benjamin Franklin which some have claimed comes to life and dances in the streets. Further, it is said the founding father's specter can be see in the facility with an armful of books and one woman claimed he pinched her buttocks.
Pennsylvania Hospital reportedly has a statue of William Penn that occasionally, when under a full moon, descends its pedestal and walks the grounds.
 It is claimed that the Treehouse Building, The Pennrose Building, and the John Penn House at the Philadelphia Zoo experience paranormal activity including full body apparitions and poltergeist activity. It is said that the spirit of a woman in a long dress can be seen standing atop the main staircase of the John Penn House.
 It is claimed Physick Mansion is haunted by the namesake's wife, reportedly seen weeping in the yard near the site of her beloved tree that was chopped down shortly before her demise.

 Powel House is said to be haunted by numerous spirits including the Marquis de La Fayette, Benedict Arnold, his wife Peggy, and Continental soldiers.
 The cemetery of St. Peter's Episcopal Church is said to have a ghost tha is seen standing over the grave of Robert Luciano every night at 9 p.m.
 The USS Olympia, stationed as part of the Independence Seaport Museum, reportedly has shadow figures, apparitions, and disembodied voices.
 Washington Square is said to be haunted by the ghost of Leah, a Quaker woman that protected the thousands of graves therein from robbers in life.

Other area hauntings
 Albertus L. Meyers Bridge in Allentown is the site of around 80 documented suicides over the course of a hundred years. People have claimed to have seen ghosts on the bridge.
 Cranberry Manor Bed and Breakfast in East Stroudsburg, PA claims to have a ghost kitty and girl roaming about the B&B.

 Mishler Theatre in Altoona is said to be haunted by Isaac Mishler, a howling dog, and a woman that creates mischief in the restroom.
 Lebanon Valley College in Annville Township, Mary Capp Green residence hall is claimed to be haunted by a little girl. 
 Getter's Island in Easton is said to be haunted by Charles Getter, who was hanged in front of thousands of people in 1933 for the murder of his wife. Getter, who survived the first attempt to hang him, was the last person in Pennsylvania to be publicly executed.
 Growden Mansion (Trevose Manor) in Bensalem, Pennsylvania is said to host the specter of Benjamin Franklin, flying his kite in his effort to discover electricity.
 Pen Ryn Mansion and the accompanying grounds in Bensalem are said to be haunted by Robert Bickley and a woman who is believed to be his girlfriend (the latter seen atop a black horse and wielding a whip). It is claimed that every December 24th Robert is seen walking the grounds and raps desperately on the doors and windows of the houses while the woman whips those that come near and rides through crowds.
 The Outside In School in Bolivar, has claims of a ghost of a Native American girl who haunts the school's campus, which is next to her stone marked grave.
 Along the Brandywine River around the site of the Battle of Brandywine, is claimed to be haunted by the ghosts of horses and soldiers and the sounds of battle.

Cashtown Inn, a historic bed & breakfast in Cashtown is claimed to have the ghost of a Confederate soldier from the Civil War walking around the hallway and bar area, as featured in an episode of Ghost Hunters. 
 Thornbury Farm in Chadds Ford Township is reputedly haunted by a mischievous little girl that can be heard sobbing.
 Hotel Conneaut in Conneaut Lake is claimed to be haunted by a young boy, a butcher, and a bride named Elizabeth who died in a fire at the hotel in 1943.
 The Brinton Lodge in Douglassville is a reputedly haunted house. The original structure, built in the early 18th century, was a one-room building which was operated as a tavern/roadhouse stop along the Schuylkill River Canal System. It was later expanded into a summer home, remodeled into a gentlemen's club, then operated as a bar and restaurant until recently. It is currently being preserved as a house museum, which holds fundraising events including a Halloween haunted house. It is also home to Hidden River Brewing Company. Legend has it that at least five spirits inhabit this property, including Caleb Brinton, "Dapper Dan", an older woman, a young girl, and a "lady in white".

 The Fairfield Inn in Fairfield is reportedly haunted by multiple ghosts including mischievous soldiers in the kitchen, an old man in the dining area, and a woman that opens doors on the third floor.
 Crier in the Country Restaurant in Glen Mills was said to be haunted by former owner Lydia Powell. The restaurant was demolished in 2018.
 Keith House in Graeme Park is said to be haunted by Elizabeth "Maggie" Graeme (daughter of Dr. Thomas Graeme), who was heartbroken by her husband Henry Hugh Fergusson after he abandoned her at the end of the American Revolutionary War, a spirit believed to be Fergusson, and a headless servant.
 The Harrisburg State Hospital in Harrisburg is reported to have violent poltergeist activity.
 The Phillips' Rangers Monument in Hesston is the site of Captain William Phillips and his Rangers massacre at the hands of Natives, supposedly haunted by the ghost of Phillips.

 Bolton Mansion in Levittown, also called Phineas Pemberton House, is said to have both an intellectual and residual haunting.
 The Knickerbocker Hotel in Linesville claims paranormal circumstances make their guests ill or cause their deaths.
 The General Warren Inn in Malvern is believed to be haunted by soldiers of the American Revolutionary War.
 U.S. Route 322, between Meadville and Radnor along this road, it's claimed  on New Year's Day, the ghost of Anthony Wayne rides a horse in search of his bones that were scattered along the route.
General Wayne Inn located in Merion, Pennsylvania is alleged to have poltergeist activity (generally of a mischievous nature) and disembodied screams. It is also claimed to be home to manifestations of a Hessian soldier, a British officer seeking a locket, a severed head, and Edgar Allan Poe (a frequent patron in life) according to investigations by Unsolved Mysteries and Haunted History.
 Hill View Manor in New Castle is claimed to be haunted by spirits.
 The Logan Inn in New Hope has claims of ghosts of American Revolutionary War soldiers and Aaron Burr.
 Selma Mansion in Norristown is believed to be haunted with voices.

 Kelly Road, in Ohioville, a mile-long stretch of road nicknamed "Mystery Mile" by former residents, is reported to be the site of supernatural activity.
 The Dixmont State Hospital near Pittsburgh is said to be home to several entities including a male that would patrol the morgue and try to frighten those that entered the area.
 Psychic Theater in Scranton (at 1433 N. Main Avenue) tells of a haunting: "the legend of a long-ago murder victim that still haunts the 100-year-old building...that (has) been featured on the Travel Channel." According to the Pennsylvania Department of Tourism's Pursuit Magazine article of the top ten most haunted places, "one should be ready for a true scare...", and it is "not for the timid or weak of heart."
 The former Alpha Sigma Phi fraternity house at Slippery Rock University of Pennsylvania in Slippery Rock is said to be haunted by Samuel Mohawk and his victims of the Wigton Massacre, though the massacre occurred miles away in Brady Township.
 Pennhurst State School and Hospital in Spring City is reported to have numerous accounts of paranormal activity and was featured on the paranormal TV shows Ghost Adventures, Ghost Hunters and Extreme Paranormal. Additionally, it has been featured on the web series Buzzfeed Unsolved.

 Valley Forge National Historical Park in Valley Forge is haunted by ghost soldiers that have been seen roaming the grounds. There are claims that the spirits of George Washington and Anthony Wayne have been witnessed there.
 Penn Common in York is believed to be haunted by soldiers executed by the forces of Anthony Wayne.
 The house of the Smurl family between 1974 and 1989 in West Pittston.
 The Grand Midway Hotel in Windber, Pennsylvania is said to be haunted by many deceased from its over 130 years of existence.
 Elkins Park  Residents on Osceola Ave. in Elkins Park have reported hauntings with signs such as, cold spots, objects falling off of shelves, objects being thrown, electrical disturbances and many other odd things happening on a daily basis. One resident said he was "struck in the back of his head by a small paint can." while hanging book shelves. Strange animal behavior has also been reported and described as follows, family pets reacting to kind gestures and "having their tummies rubbed" by what has been dubbed an "invisible child". No further investigations have been made.
 Stemie's Place is a restaurant in Easton, Pennsylvania, located in the historical building formerly known as the Black Horse Inn, built in 1782. It was featured in an episode of Animal Planet's The Haunted because of its supposedly paranormal activity resulting from the murder of mobster Johnny Ferrara in 1928. In 2017 a new restaurant opened there and it was renamed Bacon Gourmet.

See also
 List of reportedly haunted locations in the United States

References